Robert William Hay (1786–1861) was a British public official.

Biography

Early life
Robert William Hay was born in 1786 in Westminster, London, England. His father was Reverend George William Auriol Hay-Drummond and his mother Elizabeth Margaret (Marshall) Hay-Drummond. His paternal grandfather was Robert Hay Drummond (1711–1776), who served as the Archbishop of York from 1761 to 1776.

He graduated from Christ Church, Oxford, where he received a Bachelor of Arts degree in 1807 and a Master of Arts degree in 1809.

Career
From 1812 to 1824, he served as Private Secretary to Henry Dundas, 1st Viscount Melville (1742–1811), who was First Lord of the Admiralty, and then served as Victualling Commissioner in the British Royal Navy.

He served as the Permanent Under-Secretaries of State for the Colonies from 1825 to 1836. However, James Stephen (1789–1859) is credited with doing much of the work.

In 1831, Hay was appointed to serve on the Government Commission upon Emigration, which was wound up in 1832.

He was elected a Fellow of the Royal Society in 1814.

Death
He died on 9 May 1861 in Malta.

Legacy
Hay Street, a major road in the central business district of Perth, Western Australia, is named in his honour.

References

1786 births
1861 deaths
People from Westminster
Alumni of Christ Church, Oxford
Royal Navy personnel
Civil servants in the Colonial Office
Permanent Under-Secretaries of State for the Colonies
Fellows of the Royal Society